Cape Cove is a vacated or seasonal settlement in Newfoundland and Labrador located on Fogo island.

Populated places in Newfoundland and Labrador